Michael Shane Spencer (born February 20, 1972) is a former Major League Baseball outfielder. In Major League Baseball, he played a total of 538 games for the New York Yankees, Texas Rangers, Cleveland Indians, and New York Mets, compiling 438 hits, 59 home runs, and 242 RBI.

Professional career

New York Yankees (1998–2002)
He first played briefly in April, then endeared himself memorably to fans in September by hitting 10 home runs, including three grand slams, then a record for Major League rookies, until it was broken by Alexei Ramírez in 2008. Spencer accomplished the feat in only 67 at-bats, earning him a spot on the Yankees postseason roster.

Additionally, Spencer was nicknamed Roy Hobbs in reference to the protagonist in The Natural, because he hit many home runs and was older than most rookies when brought up to the majors. 

In the postseason, Spencer hit a long home run in Yankee Stadium during the 1998 American League Division Series against the Texas Rangers as the Yankees went on to win the World Series.

Later career (2003–2006)
Spencer was not able to maintain that level of success, but became a solid role player and stayed with the Yankees through the  season, having played in four World Series, winning three. His career did not live up to expectations, though, missing much playing time due to injury and striking out too often. In  he signed with the Central League's Hanshin Tigers in Japan, appearing in 108 games and hitting 9 homers. In , he continued to play for the Tigers, but was cut.

Major league teams were reluctant to sign him, despite his major league experience, because of off-field trouble after leaving the Yankees. He cut his foot in a bar in Manhattan, and then, while he was supposed to be on rehab assignment, he was arrested for drunk driving and speeding over 97 mph. He also had problems with Florida police during spring training 2004. He and teammate Karim Garcia were accused of hitting and kicking a pizza delivery man in 2004, though all charges were dropped.

Coaching

After his playing career ended, Spencer's career turned to coaching, and he served as the hitting coach for the Lake Elsinore Storm, the Single-A affiliate of the San Diego Padres, from  until 2012. In 2013, he was named the hitting coach of the Somerset Patriots of the Atlantic League. In 2015, Spencer became the manager of the Hwaseong Heroes, the farm team of the Nexen Heroes of the Korea Baseball Organization, but stepped down from his position after being arrested for driving under the influence.

References

External links
, or Retrosheet, or Baseball Reference (Minor and Japanese Leagues), or Pelota Binaria (Venezuelan Winter League)

1972 births
Living people
American expatriate baseball players in Japan
American expatriate baseball people in South Korea
Baseball players from Florida
Cardenales de Lara players
American expatriate baseball players in Venezuela
Cleveland Indians players
Columbus Clippers players
Gulf Coast Yankees players
Hanshin Tigers players
Major League Baseball outfielders
Major League Baseball replacement players
Minor league baseball coaches
New York Mets players
New York Yankees players
Norwich Navigators players
Oneonta Yankees players
People from Key West, Florida
Tampa Yankees players
Texas Rangers players
Tigres de Aragua players